Wildcats (Felis silvestris and Felis lybica) are small cats native to Europe, the western part of Asia, and Africa.

Wildcat or wild cat may also refer to:

Animals
 Bobcat (Lynx rufus), ranges from southern Canada to northern Mexico, including most of the continental United States
 Canada lynx (Lynx canadensis), native to Canada, Alaska as well as some parts of the lower 48 United States
 Eurasian lynx (Lynx lynx), native to European and Siberian forests
 Iberian lynx (Lynx pardinus), native to the Iberian Peninsula in Southern Europe
 Scottish wildcat (Felis silvestris sylvestris)
 Any wild felid

Arts and entertainment

Comic books and comic strips
 Wildcat (DC Comics), a name used by several DC Comics characters, including:
 Wildcat (Ted Grant)
 Wildcat (Yolanda Montez)
 Wildcats (comic), a comic created by Jim Lee
 Wildcat (UK comic), a British comic published by IPC Media
 Wildcat, a comic strip by Donald Rooum
 Wildcat Comic Con, an annual fan convention held in Williamsport, Pennsylvania since 2012

Film, television, and theatre
 The Wildcat (1917 film)
 The Wild Cat (1921 film), directed by Ernst Lubitsch
 The Wildcat (1936 film), a Spanish musical drama
 Wildcat (1942 film), a film starring Richard Arlen and Buster Crabbe
 Wildcat (musical), a 1960 Broadway musical
 Wildcat, a 1981 New Zealand film
 Wildcats (film), a 1986 film starring Goldie Hawn
 Wildcat (2022 film), a documentary film about animal rescue
 Wildcat (upcoming film), a biographical film of American novelist Flannery O'Connor
 Wild C.A.T.s (TV series), based on the Jim Lee comic
 Wildcat, a character in the Disney animated series TaleSpin

Literature
 "Wildcat" (short story), by Flannery O'Connor
 Wild Cat (boat), a small fictional schooner in two of Arthur Ransome's Swallows and Amazons series of children's books
 Wildcats, a fictional basketball team in High School Musical

Music
 Wild Cat (Danko Jones album), 2017
 Wild Cat (Tygers of Pan Tang album), 1980
 Wildcat (Sunnyboys album) a 1989 album by Australian band Sunnyboys
 "Wild Cat" (1927 song), by Joe Venuti and Eddie Lang
 "Wildcat", a 1960 song by Gene Vincent
 "Wildcat", a 2006 song from Classics (Ratatat album)
 Wildcat! Wildcat!, an American band

Other uses in arts and entertainment
 Arizona Daily Wildcat, University of Arizona student newspaper
 Wildcat (anarchist newspaper), a London-based monthly published from 1974 to 1975
 WildCat (roller coaster), several amusement park rides

Military divisions
 Wildcat, nickname of the 81st Infantry Division (United States)
 Wildcats, nickname of VFA-131, a United States Navy fighter squadron
 Wildcats, nickname of 438 Tactical Helicopter Squadron of the Royal Canadian Air Force

People
Mononyms
 Wild Cat (Seminole) (c. 1807/1810–1857), Native American Seminole chieftain who was active in the Second Seminole War
 "Wildcat", ring name of Robbie Brookside (born 1966), British professional wrestler and trainer
 "Wildcat", ring name of Chris Harris (wrestler) (born 1973), American professional wrestler
Nicknames
 Wildcat Monte (born Monte Deadwiley; 1905–1961), American professional boxer
 Lance C. Wade (1915–1944), American World War II ace with the Royal Air Force
 George "Wildcat" Wilson (1901–1963), American college football player
 Larry Wilson (American football) (1938–2021), American professional football player
Middle name
 Thomas Wildcat Alford (1860–1938), Absentee Shawnee advocate and teacher
Surname
 Tommy Wildcat (born 1967), Native American musician

Places

Canada
 Wildcat, Alberta, in Rocky View County, Alberta
 Wildcat 12, Queens County, Nova Scotia

United States
 Wildcat Township, Tipton County, Indiana
 Grayson, Oklahoma, formerly known as Wildcat
 Wildcat, West Virginia, an unincorporated community
 Wildcat Brook, in the White Mountains of New Hampshire
 Wildcat Canyon, Contra Costa County, California.
 Wildcat Creek (disambiguation), multiple waterflows
 Wildcat Falls, Yosemite National Park, California
 Wildcat Hills, Nebraska
 Wildcat Hollow, Connecticut, in Litchfield County
 Wildcat Marsh, Contra Costa County, California
 Wildcat Mountain (disambiguation), multiple summits

Sports

Teams

Canada
Edmonton Wildcats, a Canadian football team based in Edmonton, Alberta
Hamilton Wildcats (Canadian football), a defunct Canadian football team based in Hamilton, Ontario
Hamilton Wildcats (Australian football), an amateur Australian rules football club based in Hamilton, Ontario
London Wildcats (1994–1995), a professional ice hockey team in the Colonial Hockey League, moved to Dayton, Ohio and renamed
Moncton Wildcats, a franchise in the Quebec Major Junior Hockey League, based in Moncton, New Brunswick
Monkton Wildcats, a WOAA Senior Hockey League hockey team based in Monkton, Ontario
Northern Wildcats (1998–2002), a Canadian Junior ice hockey team based in Longlac, Ontario
St. Thomas Wildcats (1991–1993), a professional ice hockey team in the Colonial Hockey League, relocated and renamed the London Wildcats (see above)
Valley Wildcats, a junior ice hockey franchise from the Annapolis Valley region of Nova Scotia

United Kingdom
Durham Wildcats, a basketball team based in Newton Aycliffe, County Durham
Kingston Wildcats, an English Basketball League team
Swindon Wildcats, a UK professional ice hockey team
Wakefield Trinity Wildcats, an English rugby league team
Weymouth Wildcats (1954-2010), a British motorcycle speedway team based in Weymouth, England
West London Wildcats, an Australian rules football and netball club based in London, England
Newcastle Wildcats, the ice hockey team of Newcastle University, England

United States
Arizona Wildcats, the sports teams of the University of Arizona
Arkansas Wildcats, a team of the Women's Football Alliance
Atlanta Wildcats, an American Basketball Association team
Central Washington Wildcats, the sports teams of Central Washington University
Colorado Wildcats (1998), a team in the Professional Indoor Football League 
Connecticut Wildcats, a rugby league team in the USA Rugby League
Daemen College Wildcats, the sports teams of Daemen College
Hershey Wildcats (1997–2001), a professional soccer team in the USL A-League, based in Hershey, Pennsylvania
Jackson Wildcats (2002–2007), a United States Basketball League team based in Jackson, Mississippi 
Kansas State Wildcats, the sports teams of Kansas State University
Kentucky Wildcats, the sports teams of the University of Kentucky
Los Angeles Wildcats (AFL) (1926), an American Football League team (actually based in Chicago)
Los Angeles Wildcats (XFL) (2020–present), an XFL team
Mahoning Valley Wildcats, a defunct International Basketball League team based in Struthers, Ohio, removed from the IBL schedule in early 2006
Minnesota Wildcats (2008–2011), a Tier III Jr. An ice hockey team playing in the Minnesota Junior Hockey League
New Hampshire Wildcats, the sports teams of the University of New Hampshire
New Jersey Wildcats, a women's United Soccer Leagues W-League team
New Mexico Wildcats (2008–2009), an American Indoor Football Association team
Northwestern Wildcats, the sports teams of Northwestern University, a Big Ten college in Evanston, Illinois
Richmond Wildcats, a minor ice hockey team based in Richmond, Virginia
Rose City Wildcats (2010), a Women's Spring Football League team that was based in Portland, Oregon
San Diego Wildcats (2006–2009), a team in the American Basketball Association 
Savannah Wildcats, a charter member of the Continental Basketball League, based in Savannah, Georgia 
South Georgia Wildcats (2002–2009), a professional arena football team
Villanova Wildcats, the sports teams of Villanova University
West Virginia Wildcatz, an American Basketball Association team based in Fairmont, West Virginia
Wheeling Wildcats (2008–2009), a professional indoor football team in Wheeling, West Virginia
Wichita Falls Wildcats, a Tier II Junior A ice hockey team in the North American Hockey League
 Wildcats, the name of many college sports teams

In other countries
CIT-U Wildcats, the sports teams of the Cebu Institute of Technology–University in Cebu City, Philippines
Maastricht Wildcats, an amateur American football team based in Maastricht, The Netherlands
Papatoetoe Wildcats, an American football club established in 1986 in South Auckland, New Zealand
Perth Wildcats, an Australian basketball team in the National Basketball League
Wolfenbüttel Wildcats, a defunct German women's basketball team dissolved in 2013

Other uses in sport
 Dorotas Wildcat (whelped 2015), a racing greyhound
 Hollywood Wildcat (1990–2012), a Thoroughbred racehorse
 Wildcat formation, an American football offensive scheme
 Wildcat Stadium, various sports stadiums in the United States

Technology

Vehicles
 , four United States Navy ships named Wild Cat or Wildcat
 Wildcat APC, an armoured personnel carrier used in Israel
 AgustaWestland AW159 Wildcat, a British helicopter introduced in 2014
 Bowler Wildcat, an off-road racing vehicle
 Buick Wildcat, an automobile
 Melling Wildcat, a high-performance British sports car
 Daihatsu Taft (F10), an automobile
 Grumman F4F Wildcat, an American World War II carrier fighter
 Hobie Wildcat, a catamaran
 USC&GS Wildcat (1919), a launch in commission with the United States Coast and Geodetic Survey from 1919 to 1941
 Sabre Wildcat, an American ultralight aircraft

Other uses in technology
 Wildcat! BBS, a bulletin board system software package
 Wildcat cartridge, a specialty firearm cartridge not produced by commercial ammunition manufacturers
 Wildcat, a sprocketed wheel for an anchor chain; see anchor windlass

Other uses
 Wildcat strike action, a strike action of workers that is not authorized by union leadership
 Wildcatter, a person who drills for oil in areas not yet known to have oil fields
 Wildcat banking, the issuance of currency by private banks in the antebellum United States
 17493 Wildcat, an asteroid
 The Wildcat Cafe, Yellowknife, Northwest Territories, Canada

See also
 Bobcat (disambiguation)
 Wild Cat (disambiguation)
 
 

Animal common name disambiguation pages